Psilopa leucostoma is a species of shore flies (insects in the family Ephydridae).

Distribution
Austria, Belgium, Finland, France, Great Britain, Italy, Poland.

References

Ephydridae
Diptera of Europe
Insects described in 1830
Taxa named by Johann Wilhelm Meigen